The Bergen County Cooperative Library System (BCCLS, pronounced "buckles") is a consortium of public libraries in the four northeastern New Jersey Gateway Region counties of Bergen, Hudson, Passaic, and Essex. Founded on October 1, 1979, the organization allows for reciprocal borrowing among its members so that books, audiobooks, CDs, DVDs and other media are shared among the libraries cooperatively. Those with a valid library card from participating towns are permitted to reserve materials online and have them transferred to their local library, where materials can be retrieved.

As of 2019, there are 77 public libraries with a total of 81 branches participating in the consortium. All of Bergen County's public libraries are members of the BCCLS, along with 15 libraries from Essex, Hudson, and Passaic counties. A patron's hometown library card is honored at all participating libraries. The BCCLS had also participated in the Open Borrowing (www.openborrowing.org) program, with participating libraries in Middlesex, Morris, Passaic, Sussex and Warren counties; this participation ended on January 1, 2015.

Locations

See also
Burlington County Library
Camden County Library
Monmouth County Library System
Ocean County Library

References

External links
 

County library systems in New Jersey
Education in Bergen County, New Jersey
Education in Hudson County, New Jersey
Education in Passaic County, New Jersey
Education in Essex County, New Jersey
Libraries established in 1979
Library consortia in New Jersey
1979 establishments in New Jersey